Kouadio Otokpa (born 9 June 1959) is an Ivorian sprinter. He competed in the men's 100 metres at the 1984 Summer Olympics.

References

1959 births
Living people
Athletes (track and field) at the 1984 Summer Olympics
Ivorian male sprinters
Olympic athletes of Ivory Coast
Place of birth missing (living people)